Otis House may refer to:
Otis House (Prescott, Arizona), listed on the NRHP in Yavapai County, Arizona
First Harrison Gray Otis House, Boston, MA, listed on the NRHP in Massachusetts
Second Harrison Gray Otis House, Boston, MA, listed on the NRHP in Massachusetts
Third Harrison Gray Otis House, Boston, MA
Otis-Wyman House, Somerville, MA, listed on the NRHP in Massachusetts